Xenocles is the name of two Greek tragedians.

There were two Athenian tragic poets of this name, one the grandfather of the other. No fragments of either are currently known, except for a few words of the elder apparently parodied in Aristophanes' The Clouds.

The elder Xenocles wrote a play about Oedipus.

Aristophanes called the elder Xenocles an execrable poet and was never tired of ridiculing him; describing, along with his father, Carcinus the Elder, three brothers and a member of the third generation (also called Carcinus), "a whole potful of tragic crabs". He also wrote that "Xenocles, who is ugly, makes ugly poetry". In his play Thesmophoriazusae the chorus claims "Even this audience, I'm sure/Would find the man a crashing bore" which highlights his doubtful views on Xenocles as a writer. However, in 415 BC Xenocles gained the first prize with one of his trilogies when in competition with Euripides. But Aelian accounts for this by saying that "the jury were either intellectually incapable of a proper decision or else they were bribed."

Notes

References 
 William Smith, Dictionary of Greek and Roman Biography and Mythology,  v. 3, pp. 1289–90, 1870.
 Aristophanes, The Frogs and Other Plays, Penguin Classics, translated by David Barrett.

5th-century BC Greek people
5th-century BC writers
Ancient Greek poets
Ancient Greek dramatists and playwrights
Tragic poets
Year of birth unknown
Year of death unknown